The 2014–15 season is Motherwell's thirtieth consecutive season in the top flight of Scottish football and the second in the newly established Scottish Premiership, having been promoted from the Scottish First Division at the end of the 1984–85 season. Motherwell will also compete in the Europa League, League Cup and the Scottish Cup.

Important Events
On 2 November Stuart McCall resigned as manager, with Kenny Black taking over as caretaker manager until Ian Baraclough was appointed as manager on 13 December. Black returned to his role as assistant manager following the appointment of Baraclough, but was sacked by the club on 6 February 2015.

Transfers

In

Loans in

Out

Loans out

Released

Friendlies

Competitions

Overview

Premiership

League table

Results by round

Results summary

Results

Premiership play-offs

Scottish Cup

Scottish League Cup

UEFA Europa League

Qualifying phase

Squad statistics

Appearances

|-
|colspan="14"|Players away from the club on loan:

|-
|colspan="14"|Players who appeared for Motherwell no longer at the club:

|}

Goal scorers

Disciplinary record

See also
 List of Motherwell F.C. seasons

Notes and references

External links
 Motherwell F.C. Website
 BBC My Club Page
 Motherwell F.C. Newsnow

Motherwell F.C. seasons
Motherwell F.C.
Motherwell